Divya Prabha (born 18 May 1991) is an Indian actress who predominantly appears in Malayalam and Tamil-language films. She gained wider attention for her roles in the films  Take Off and Thamaasha.
In 2015, she won Kerala State Television Award for Best Second Actress for her performance in the TV serial Eswaran Sakshiyayi.

Acting career

Divya made her screen debut with the 2013 film lokpal. Her first Tamil film was Kayal directed by Prabhu Solomon. She played a character role in the film Vettah directed by Rajesh Pillai. In Take Off she played a nurse. In 2018, she played supporting roles in the period film Kammara Sambhavam and sports thriller Nonsense. In 2019, she acted in A Very Normal Family, a theatre play directed by Roshan Mathew. She then acted in the movie Thamaasha.

Filmography

TV serials

Theatre
 2019: A Very Normal Family (Mollyamma)

Award and nominations
Kerala State Television Awards
 2015: Kerala State Television Award for Best Second Actress– Eswaran Sakshiyayi (Malayalam Soap Opera - Flowers TV)

Locarno International Film Festival 
 Nomination for the Best Actress at the Locarno International Film Festival in the International Competition Session for the Movie Ariyippu (2022).

References

External links

 
 
 

Living people
Actresses from Thrissur
Actresses in Malayalam cinema
Indian film actresses
Actresses in Malayalam television
Indian television actresses
21st-century Indian actresses
Actresses in Tamil cinema
1991 births